is a Japanese kickboxer, currently competing in the featherweight division of K-1. He is the former Krush Super Featherweight champion.

Kickboxing career

Super featherweight
Anpo made his professional debut against Takayuki Tsujita at HOOST CUP KINGS WEST on November 16, 2014. He won the fight by a first-round knockout. Anpo made his next HOOST CUP appearance against Takuya Taira at HOOST CUP SPIRIT5 on March 1, 2015. He once again won the fight by a first-round stoppage.

Anpo made his Krush debut opposite Yuki Miwa at Krush.69 on September 30, 2016. He won the fight by a first-round knockout. Anpo next faced Tatsuya Inaishi at Krush.71 on December 18, 2016. He won the fight by majority decision, with two judges scoring the bout 30–29 in his favor, while the third judge scored the bout as an even 29–29 draw.

Anpo faced Leona Pettas for the vacant Krush Super Featherweight title at Krush.76 on May 28, 2017, in the finals of the 2017 Krush Super Featherweight tournament. Anpo had earned his place in the tournament finals with a first-round knockout of Masahiro Yamamoto in the quarterfinals and a decision victory over Masanobu Goshu in the semifinals. He achieved his career-best win, as he beat Pettas by unanimous decision, with two scorecards of 30–28 and one scorecard of 30–29.

Anpo made his first Krush title defense against Masanobu Goshu at Krush.81 on October 1, 2017. He lost the fight by split decision.

Anpo faced Hayato at Krush.89 on June 30, 2018. He won the fight by unanimous decision, with scores of 30–29, 30–28 and 30–29.

On December 8, 2018 Riku lost his K-1 debut at the K-1 World GP 2018: K-1 Lightweight World Tournament event when Taio Asahisa beat him by Unanimous decision. He suffered a late third round knock down.

Featherweight
Anpo stayed inactive for most of the 2019 year due to injuries sustained in training. On November 24 he participated in the K-1 Featherweight World Grand Prix and lost by KO in the first round to Jawsuayai Sor.Dechaphan in quarter final. He lost in the first round, due to a body shot knockout.

Lightweight
Anpo was expected to face Shoya at Krush 139 on July 30, 2022, in what was supposed to be his lightweight debut and his first fight in 32 months. He was forced to withdraw from the bout at the official weigh-ins however, as he was diagnosed with hypokalemia caused by the weight cut.

Titles and accomplishments

Amateur
All Japan Glove Karate Federation
2008 All Japan Glove Karate Federation Elementary School Championship
2009 All Japan Glove Karate Federation Elementary School Championship and Skill Award
King of Strikers
2012 Kings of Strikers -50kg Championship

Professional
Krush
2017 Krush Super Featherweight Tournament Winner
2017 Krush Super Featherweight Championship

Kickboxing record

|-  style="background:#FFBBBB;"
| 2019-11-24 || Loss|| align=left| Jawsuayai Sor.Dechaphan || K-1 World GP 2019 Yokohamatsuri -57.5kg Championship Tournament Quarter Final  || Yokohama, Japan ||KO (Flying knee & punches) || 1 || 1:14
|-style="background:#FFBBBB;"
| 2018-12-08|| Loss || align=left| Taio Asahisa || K-1 World GP 2018: K-1 Lightweight World's Best Tournament || Osaka, Japan ||  Decision (Unanimous) || 3 || 3:00
|-  style="background:#CCFFCC;"
| 2018-09-30|| Win ||align=left| Takuma Kawaguchi || Krush.93 || Tokyo, Japan || TKO (Towel thrown) || 3 || 1:53
|-  style="background:#CCFFCC;"
| 2018-06-30|| Win ||align=left| Hayato || Krush.89 || Tokyo, Japan || Decision (Unanimous) || 3 || 3:00
|-  style="background:#FFBBBB;"
| 2017-10-01|| Loss ||align=left| Masanobu Goshu || Krush.81 || Tokyo, Japan || Decision (Split) || 3 || 3:00
|-
! style=background:white colspan=9 |
|-  style="background:#CCFFCC;"
| 2017-05-28|| Win ||align=left| Leona Pettas || Krush.76, Tournament Final || Tokyo, Japan || Decision (Unanimous) || 3 || 3:00
|-
! style=background:white colspan=9 |
|-  style="background:#CCFFCC;"
| 2017-04-02|| Win ||align=left| Masanobu Goshu || Krush.75, Tournament Semifinal || Tokyo, Japan || Decision (Unanimous) || 3 || 3:00
|-  style="background:#CCFFCC;"
| 2017-02-18|| Win ||align=left| Masahiro Yamamoto || Krush.73, Tournament Quarterfinal || Tokyo, Japan || KO (3 Knockdowns/Punches) || 1 || 2:06
|-  style="background:#CCFFCC;"
| 2016-12-18|| Win ||align=left| Tatsuya Inaishi || Krush.71 || Tokyo, Japan || Decision (Majority)|| 3 || 3:00
|-  style="background:#CCFFCC;"
| 2016-09-30|| Win ||align=left| Yuki Miwa || Krush.69 || Tokyo, Japan || KO (Punches) || 2 || 2:52
|-  style="background:#CCFFCC;"
| 2015-03-01|| Win ||align=left| Takuya Taira || HOOST CUP SPIRIT5 || Kyoto, Japan || KO (High kick)  || 1 || 2:40
|-  style="background:#CCFFCC;"
| 2014-11-16|| Win ||align=left| Takayuki Tsujita || HOOST CUP KINGS WEST || Osaka, Japan || KO (Knee to the body) || 1 || 1:40
|-
| colspan=9 | Legend:    

|-  style="background:#CCFFCC;"
| 2013-05-26|| Win||align=left| Takuto Asahi ||GLADIATOR 56 || Hyōgo Prefecture, Japan || TKO|| 1 || 1:50

|-  style="text-align:center; background:#c5d2ea;"
| 2013-03-31|| Draw||align=left| Rikuto Adachi || Chakuriki Gold Rush in RKS || Osaka, Japan || Decision || 2 ||2:00 

|-  style="background:#FFBBBB;"
| 2012-11-18|| Loss||align=left| Shinichiro Morishita ||KJC Junior Kick Tournament, Final || Osaka, Japan || Decision (Unanimous)|| 2 || 2:00
|-
! style=background:white colspan=9 |
|-  style="background:#CCFFCC;"
| 2012-11-18|| Win||align=left| Naoki Takahashi ||KJC Junior Kick Tournament, Semi Final || Osaka, Japan || Decision|| 2 || 2:00
|-  style="background:#CCFFCC;"
| 2012-11-18|| Win||align=left| Matsumoto ||KJC Junior Kick Tournament, Quarter Final || Osaka, Japan || Decision|| 2 || 2:00
|-  style="background:#CCFFCC;"
| 2012-07-05|| Win||align=left| Kaito Hayashi ||Kanto vs Kansai Battle || Japan || Decision|| 2 || 2:00
|-  style="background:#FFBBBB;"
| 2012-05-20|| Loss||align=left| Shiori Morishita||KJC Junior Kick 2  || Osaka, Japan || Decision (Unanimous)|| 2 || 2:00
|-  style="background:#c5d2ea;"
| 2012-03-11|| Draw||align=left| Naoki Takahashi ||KJC Junior Kick 1  || Osaka, Japan || Decision || 2 || 2:00
|-  style="background:#CCFFCC;"
| 2012-01-29|| Win||align=left| Naoki Yamamoto ||KING OF STRIKERS Round 7 || Fukuoka Prefecture, Japan || Decision|| 3 || 2:00
|-
! style=background:white colspan=9 |
|-  style="background:#FFBBBB;"
| 2011-10-10|| Loss||align=left| Hiroyoshi Matsuoka ||KJC Junior Kick 2  || Fukuoka Prefecture, Japan || Decision || 1 || 2:00
|-  style="background:#CCFFCC;"
| 2011-07-03|| Win||align=left| Yoshiki Takei ||Muay Thai WINDY Super Fight in NAGOYA ～Muay Tyhoon!～ || Nagoya, Japan || Decision (Unanimous)|| 2 || 1:30
|-  style="background:#CCFFCC;"
| 2011-05-04|| Win||align=left| Hiyuu Asada ||MISSION 21 || Osaka, Japan || Decision (Unanimous)|| 2 || 1:30
|-  style="background:#FFBBBB;"
| 2011-04-17|| Loss||align=left| Shiori Morishita ||CRAZY KING vol.3  || Hyōgo Prefecture, Japan || Decision || 3 || 3:00
|-  style="background:#CCFFCC;"
| 2010-04-25|| Win||align=left| Tsubasa Seita ||NEXT LEVEL AJKF Amateur || Okayama Prefecture, Japan || Decision (Unanimous)|| 2 || 2:00
|-
| colspan=9 | Legend:

See also
 List of male kickboxers
 List of Krush champions

References

Living people
1997 births
Japanese male kickboxers
People from Himeji, Hyōgo
Sportspeople from Hyōgo Prefecture